Mighty Rivers may refer to:

"Mighty Rivers", a 1985 song by Graham Parker and The Shot from Steady Nerves
"Mighty Rivers", a 2010 song by Kylie Minogue from Aphrodite
"Mighty Rivers", a 2011 song by John Wetton from Raised in Captivity

See also 
Jeremy Wade's Mighty Rivers, a 2018 Animal Planet TV show hosted by Jeremy Wade
 Mighty River (disambiguation)